"Mud Mud Ke" is a Hindi song written by Tony Kakkar and sung by Tony Kakkar and Neha Kakkar. The video of the song is directed by Mihir Gulati and the music is produced by Anshul Garg and Tony Kakkar under Desi Music Factory. This song features Michele Morrone and Jacqueline Fernandez in the music video.

Cast
 Michele Morrone
 Jacqueline Fernandez
 Tony Kakkar

Music video
The music video titled "Mud Mud Ke" was released by Desi Music Factory on YouTube. The music video marks the debut of an Italian actor Michele Morrone in the Indian Music Industry alongside   Sri Lankan Actress Jacqueline Fernandez was shot in Dubai.

The song depicts Morrone as a Gangster doing a business deal and fighting with rival.

Reception 
It received more than 2 million views on YouTube trending at #4 within 12 hours of the official release.

Personnel 

 Song : "Mud Mud Ke"
 Starring : Michele Morrone and Jacqueline Fernandez
 Location : Italy and Sri Lanka (Starring)
 Singer : Tony Kakkar and Neha Kakkar
 Lyricist and Composer : Tony Kakkar
 Music Director : Tony Kakkar 
 Mixing and Mastering : Naweed @whitfieldmastering, London
 Video Director : Mihir Gulati
 DOP : Manish Shunty
 Editor : Hitesh Chandwani (Frogalised Productions)
 Assistant Director : Rishabh Dang and Hitesh Chandwani
 Producers  : Anshul Garg and Tony Kakkar
 Choreographer  : Shakti Mohan
 Online Promotion: Underdog Digital
 Label : Desi Music Factory 
 Supporting Production : Metro Talkies & Third Eye Films, Dubai

References

External links 
 
 Mud Mud ke on YouTube

Hindi-language songs
2022 songs